Death Is My Only Friend is the fifth studio album by American hardcore punk band Death by Stereo, released in July 2009. It is their first album in four years, since the release of Death for Life in 2005, the longest gap between Death by Stereo's studio albums to date.

Album information
Writing and recording sessions for Death Is My Only Friend lasted for almost two years, making it the longest time Death by Stereo has ever spent making an album. Writing for the follow-up to Death for Life began in the summer/fall 2006 while original guitarist Jim Miner and original drummer Jarrod Alexander would reunite with the band to work on the album.

It was confirmed by frontman Efrem Schulz that this album would be recorded with two drummers, Alexander and Chris Dalley (from Ten Foot Pole). Dalley, who had toured with the band for the last few months since the departure of longtime drummer Todd Hennig, will be doing the bulk of future tours, while Alexander tours with his post-Death by Stereo band A Static Lullaby.

Schulz also confirmed that Miner will be doing random, but will not be doing full tours while promoting this album. However, he would only be writing and recording the album, only months after his recent wrist surgery. Miner's brother, Paul, also returned to the band to play bass on the new album along with the band's current bassist, Tyler Rebbe, who has been recording an album with his other band Pulley.

Death Is My Only Friend also marks the first time that Alexander and the Miner brothers have recorded albums together under the name Death by Stereo since If Looks Could Kill, I'd Watch You Die.

The album's seventh track, "Forever and a Day" is a re-recorded version of the track of the same name from Death for Life.

The album is now out of print.

Track listing

Band line-up
 Efrem Schulz – vocals, guitars
 Dan Palmer – lead guitar, backing vocals
 JP Giricke – rhythm guitar, backing vocals
 Tyler Rebbe – bass, backing vocals
 Chris Dalley – drums

Additional credits
Jason Freese – producer, piano, string arrangements

References

Death by Stereo albums
2009 albums
Serjical Strike Records albums